The National Pitcher of the Year Award is a college baseball award given to the best pitcher of the college baseball season by the College Baseball Foundation. The current holder of the award is Cooper Hjerpe of the Oregon State Beavers.

Winners

See also

List of college baseball awards

College Baseball Hall of Fame

Notes

References

External links

College baseball trophies and awards in the United States
College baseball player of the year awards in the United States
Awards established in 2009